Murmidius is a genus of beetles in the family Murmidiidae. There are at least twenty described species in Murmidius.

Species
These species belong to the genus Murmidius:
Murmidius araguanus Jałoszyński & Ślipiński, 2022
Murmidius australicus Jałoszyński & Ślipiński, 2022
Murmidius campbelli Jałoszyński & Ślipiński, 2022
Murmidius convexus Jałoszyński & Ślipiński, 2022
Murmidius drakei Heinze, 1944
Murmidius elongatus Jałoszyński & Ślipiński, 2022
Murmidius globosus Hinton, 1935
Murmidius hawaiianus Jałoszyński & Ślipiński, 2022
Murmidius hebrus Hinton, 1942
Murmidius irregularis Reitter, 1878
Murmidius lankanus Jałoszyński & Ślipiński, 2022
Murmidius melon Guerrero, Ramírez & Vidal, 2018
Murmidius meridensis Jałoszyński & Ślipiński, 2022
Murmidius merkli Jałoszyński & Ślipiński, 2022
Murmidius okinawanus Jałoszyński & Ślipiński, 2022
Murmidius ovalis (Beck, 1817) (minute beetle)
Murmidius panamanus Jałoszyński & Ślipiński, 2022
Murmidius rectistriatus Lewis, 1888
 Murmidius segregatus Waterhouse, 1876
 Murmidius stoicus Hinton, 1942
 Murmidius tachiranus Jałoszyński & Ślipiński, 2022
 Murmidius trujilloensis Jałoszyński & Ślipiński, 2022
 Murmidius tydeus Hinton, 1942

References

Further reading

External links

 

Coccinelloidea genera
Articles created by Qbugbot